King of Foxes is a fantasy novel by American writer Raymond E. Feist, the second book  in the Conclave of Shadows trilogy, part of The Riftwar Cycle.  It was preceded by Talon of the Silver Hawk and is followed by Exile's Return.

Plot summary
An exceptionally skilled swordsman, young Tal Hawkins was the only survivor of the massacre of his village - rescued, recruited, and trained by the mysterious order of magicians and spies, the Conclave of Shadows.  Now one of the secret society's most valuable agents, he gains entrance into the court named Duke of Olasko, the bloodthirsty and powerful despot whose armies put Tal's village to the sword, by posing as a nobleman from the distant Kingdom of the Isles.

But the enemy is cunning and well protected - in league with the foul necromancer Leso Varen, dark master of death-magic - and to gain the Duke's trust and confidence, Tal Hawkins must first sell his soul.

2003 American novels
2003 fantasy novels
American fantasy novels
Novels by Raymond E. Feist